Terry Johnson (born January 9, 1950) is a Georgia State Representative (D-Marietta) first elected in 2000.  Johnson represents Georgia District 37, which is located in Cobb County.

References

External links
 Representative Terry Johnson, Georgia General Assembly site

Members of the Georgia House of Representatives
Living people
1950 births
Place of birth missing (living people)
21st-century American politicians